Petri Forsman (born 13 December 1968) is a Finnish orienteering competitor. He received a bronze medal in the relay event at the 1993 World Orienteering Championships in West Point, together with Keijo Parkkinen, Mika Kuisma and Timo Karppinen.

See also
 List of orienteers
 List of orienteering events

References

External links

1968 births
Living people
Finnish orienteers
Male orienteers
Foot orienteers
World Orienteering Championships medalists